The 2002 season was the New Orleans Saints' 36th in the National Football League and their 27th playing home games at the Louisiana Superdome. They improved upon their previous season's performance of 7–9, winning nine games. Despite the winning season, and ranking third in total offense in 2002, the team failed to qualify for the playoffs for the ninth time in the last 10 seasons. As of 2022, this remains the only season in which the Saints have worn their gold jerseys. 

A bright moment during the season for the Saints was sweeping eventual champion Tampa Bay. Those two wins were almost guaranteed to make New Orleans a playoff team; however, three consecutive losses, all to losing teams, including one to the 1–13 Cincinnati Bengals, knocked New Orleans out of playoff contention.

Offseason

NFL Draft

Undrafted free agents

Personnel

Staff

Roster

Regular season

Schedule
Under the NFL's new scheduling formula, the Saints' non-divisional conference opponents in 2002 were primarily from the NFC North, although they also played former divisional rival the San Francisco 49ers from the NFC West, and the Washington Redskins from the NFC East. Their non-conference opponents were from the AFC North.

Game summaries

Week 2: vs. Green Bay Packers

Week 3: at Chicago Bears

Week 4: at Detroit Lions

Week 15: vs. Minnesota Vikings

Standings

References

External links
2002 New Orleans Saints on Pro-Football-Reference.com

New Orleans Saints seasons
New Orleans Saints
New